Frank Finn FZS, MBOU (1868 – 1 October 1932) was an English ornithologist.

Finn was born in Maidstone and educated at Maidstone Grammar School and Brasenose College, Oxford. He went on a collecting expedition to East Africa in 1892, and became First Assistant Superintendent of the Indian Museum, Calcutta in 1894, and Deputy Superintendent from 1895 to 1903. He then returned to England, and was editor of the Avicultural Magazine in 1909–10.

Finn was a prolific author, his works including Garden and Aviary Birds of India, How to Know the Indian Ducks (1901), The Birds of Calcutta (1901), How to Know the Indian Waders (1906), Ornithological and other Oddities (1907), The Making of Species (1909, with Douglas Dewar), Eggs and Nests of British Birds (1910) and Indian Sporting Birds (1915). He also edited Robert A. Sterndale's book on the mammals of India and Ceylon and brought out a new and abridged edition titled Sterndale's Mammalia of India (1929), which included an appendix on reptiles.

The weaver bird Ploceus megarhynchus was originally described from a specimen collected by A. O. Hume from Kaladhungi near Nainital in 1869. It was rediscovered near Calcutta by Finn, and E. C. Stuart Baker called it Finn's Weaver in the second edition of the Fauna of British India (1925).

Finn also described three new species of reptiles in collaboration with British naturalist Alfred William Alcock.

Finn was editor of The Zoologist during the last two years of its existence, from 1915 to 1916.

Notes

References
 Mullens and Swann - A Bibliography of British Ornithology (1917)

External links

 
 
 
 The Birds of Calcutta (1904)
 How to Know the Indian Waders (1906)
 Ornithological and other Oddities (1907)
 The World's Birds (1908)
 The Waterfowl of India (1909)
 Talks about Birds (1911)
 The Gamebirds of India (1911)
 Wild animals of yesterday & to-day (1913)]
 Garden and Aviary Birds of India (1915)
 Bird Behaviour: Psychical and Physiological (1919)
 Familiar London Birds (1922)
 Sterndale's Mammalia of India (1929)
 Indian Sporting Birds (1935)

1868 births
1932 deaths
People from Maidstone
Alumni of Brasenose College, Oxford
English ornithologists
Members of British Ornithologists' Union
Fellows of the Zoological Society of London
People educated at Maidstone Grammar School